Sadagolthina was a town of ancient Cappadocia, inhabited in Byzantine times. The town is known for being the ancestral place of Ulfilas, missionary to the Goths.

Its site is tentatively located near Karamollausağı, Asiatic Turkey.

References

Populated places in ancient Cappadocia
Former populated places in Turkey
Populated places of the Byzantine Empire
History of Ankara Province